David Chow may refer to:

 David Chow (The Young and the Restless), a fictional character in the American soap opera The Young and the Restless
 David Chow (politician) (born 1950), member of the Legislative Assembly of Macau